Marion Game (born 31 July 1938) is a French actress.

Filmography

References

External links

Living people
French film actresses
French television actresses
1938 births
20th-century French actresses
21st-century French actresses
People from Casablanca